Patrick Mayer (born 11 August 1986) is an Austrian football player currently playing for USK Anif.

References

1986 births
Living people
Austrian footballers

Association football midfielders
SC Rheindorf Altach players
SV Grödig players